Bagyr is a village near Ashgabat—capital of Turkmenistan—and an archeological site.

Sites

Kulmergen Kala 
A fortress constructed in the 19th century, the walls are all that remains.

Shikhalov Mausoleum 
An octagonal domed structure (also called Shikh Alou Mausoleum), this is believed to house the tomb of Nasipuri Sufi ascetic Abū ʿAlī al-Daqqāq (d. 1015).

References 

Archaeological sites in Turkmenistan